The Canon Commercial Historic District in Canon, Georgia is a  historic district which was listed on the National Register of Historic Places in 1985.  The listing included eight contributing buildings.

It includes the Canon Hotel, a two-story Georgian Revival-style building. and the W.F. Bowers Building, a one-story brick building built in the early 1890s, which, in 1985, had a "deteriorated Greek Revival-style porch at the Depot Street level that is supported by square brick columns. The central portal has a glass transom and a segmental arch and is flanked by a window on each side and four square brick wall pilasters. The porch has square wood columns and a wooden balustrade supported by square brick pillars."

See also
Historic Churches of Canon Historic District

References

Historic districts on the National Register of Historic Places in Georgia (U.S. state)
National Register of Historic Places in Franklin County, Georgia
Greek Revival architecture in Georgia (U.S. state)
Colonial Revival architecture in Georgia (U.S. state)
Buildings and structures completed in 1879